The International Ice Hockey Federation (IIHF) is the worldwide governing body for ice hockey. It is based in Zurich, Switzerland, and maintains the international ice hockey rulebook, processes international player transfers, dictates officiating guidelines and is responsible for the management of international ice hockey tournaments. The IIHF was created on 15 May 1908, under the name (in French) Ligue Internationale de Hockey sur Glace (LIHG). Belgium, France, Great Britain, Switzerland, and Bohemia (now the Czech Republic) were the founding members. The IIHF was composed entirely of European teams until 1920, when Canada and the United States joined.

As of 2022, the IIHF has 83 members. Puerto Rico is the newest member, joining on 29 September 2022.

There are three levels of membership in the IIHF. The highest level, IIHF Full Members, are nations that have their own independent ice hockey association and regularly participate in IIHF-sanctioned World Championships. The federation has 60 full members, including two suspended members. The second level, IIHF Associate Members, either do not have their own independent ice hockey association or have one, but do not yet meet IIHF standards for World Championships participation. The federation has 22 associate members. The third level, IIHF Affiliate Members, is for nations that only participate in the now-defunct Inline Hockey World Championships. The federation has one affiliate member. Full Members can vote in IIHF Congresses, while Associate and Affiliate Members cannot.

In 2022, 49 IIHF members participated in the Men's World Championships and 38 participated in the Women's World Championships.

Members

IIHF Full Members

A. Austria was expelled from the IIHF in 1920, then re-admitted on January 24, 1924. It was again expelled in 1939 and re-admitted on 27 April 1946.
B. The Canadian Amateur Hockey Association withdrew from the LIHG on 13 April 1944, then rejoined on 22 March 1947, as part of the merger with the International Ice Hockey Association.
C. The IIHF recognizes Bohemia, which joined in 1908, and Czechoslovakia as the predecessors to the Czech Republic, which officially became a member in 1993.
D. In 1940, Estonia, Latvia and Lithuania were annexed by the Soviet Union. Their membership expired on 27 April 1946. The three nations were re-admitted into the IIHF on 6 May 1992.
E. Germany was expelled in 1920, then re-admitted on January 11, 1926. It was again expelled on 27 April 1946. West Germany and East Germany were admitted into the IIHF in 1951 and 1954, respectively. Following their reunification, Germany was re-admitted into the IIHF on 3 October 1990.
F. Japan was expelled from the IIHF on 27 April 1946, then re-admitted on 10 March 1951.
G. Kuwait had originally joined the IIHF in 1985, but was expelled in 1992 due to a lack of ice hockey activity.
H. The IIHF recognizes the Soviet Union, which joined in 1952, as the predecessor to Russia, which officially became a member in 1992.
I. The IIHF recognizes Yugoslavia, which joined in 1939, as the predecessor to Serbia, which officially became a member on 28 September 2006.
J. On 22 March 1947, the LIHG chose to recognize the Amateur Hockey Association of the United States instead of the Amateur Athletic Union as the governing body of ice hockey in the United States, as part of the merger with the International Ice Hockey Association.

IIHF Associate and Affiliate Members

K. Armenia was suspended by the IIHF in April 2010, for use of ineligible players on their national team that participated in the 2010 IIHF World Championship Division III Group B in Yerevan, Armenia. The suspension was lifted in 2015.

IIHF Suspended Members

L. Russia and Belarus were suspended indefinitely by the IIHF on 28 February 2022 from competing in the IIHF World Championship because of their invasion of Ukraine.

Former IIHF Members

Notes

References

External links
 Official website of the International Ice Hockey Federation

 
Ice hockey-related lists